Westgate busway station, also known as Northwest busway station, is a planned bus station on Auckland's Northwestern Busway in New Zealand. It will be located off Gunton Drive in the suburb of Westgate. It will have an indoor waiting area, electronic real-time information in the waiting area, bike parking, and a customer service kiosk.

The next station southbound on the busway will be the Lincoln Road interchange. It will be the northbound terminus, though there have been proposals to continue the busway onwards to serve Kumeū and Huapai.

The station will have 8 sawtooth bays for buses to wait in prior to departure, with individual bus stops both on Gunton Drive and within the station.

History 
Proposals for a busway to the northwest, including a station at Westgate, go back to at least 2010. At the time, a fully separated busway, like the Northern Busway, was preferred, with bus shoulder lanes being viewed as an interim measure. In 2011, Auckland Transport moved to protect the route for future use.

In 2020, the Labour government announced $100 million for improvements to bus services in the Northwest, a first step towards the busway. According to Auckland Transport, beginning in 2021, the design process for Westgate station will take until 2023; construction will be begin that same year, with an aim for completion and opening of the station in 2026.

Services
The following bus routes are proposed to serve Westgate station when it opens: WX1, 111, 112, 114, 116, 122, 123, 125, 126, 11W, 11T, 129.

References

Northwestern Busway, Auckland
Buildings and structures in Auckland
Bus stations in New Zealand
Transport buildings and structures in the Auckland Region